Chilika TV is a regional Odia language satellite television news and entertainment channel in India. It is based in Odisha.

See also
List of Odia-language television channels
List of television stations in India

External links
chilikatv.com

Companies based in Bhubaneswar
Television channels and stations established in 2014
Odia-language television channels
2014 establishments in Odisha